Homecoming is a 1928 German silent war drama film directed by Joe May and starring Lars Hanson, Dita Parlo, and Gustav Fröhlich.

It was shot at the Babelsberg Studios in Berlin and on location in Hamburg. The film's sets were designed by the art director .

Plot 
Richard and Karl are German prisoners of war in Siberia. Since escape is almost impossible, they are unguarded and live an almost idyllic existence running a ferry. Richard misses his wife Anna greatly; he literally counts the days since he's seen her and tells Karl about her and their home in detail. When he decides to escape, Karl comes with him. While crossing a desert Richard collapses. He asks Karl to go on without him, but Karl refuses to leave his friend and carries him. But when Karl leaves to get water, Richard is recaptured and sent to work in a lead mine.

Karl makes it back to Hamburg, where he meets Anna and occupies a spare room in her flat. Soon friendship deepens, and both he and Anna have guilt feelings about their attraction.

Meanwhile, the war ends, and Richard returns just in time to witness Karl and Anna's first kiss. After his initial anger, Richard goes to Anna's bed. She cries; he takes her in his arms; she returns his embrace; but when he begins to make love to her, she refuses his advances. Richard returns to the room where Karl pretends to be asleep. He takes a pistol and prepares to kill Karl; but as he holds the gun to Karl's head, he recalls his friend's carrying him across the desert and puts the pistol away.

Realizing that "Nobody's to blame," Richard leaves Karl and Anna to each other and returns to his other great passion, life at sea on one of the great freighters that sail from Hamburg.

Cast 
 Lars Hanson as Richard
 Gustav Fröhlich as Karl
 Dita Parlo as Anna
 Theodor Loos
 Philipp Manning

Bibliography

External links 

1928 films
Films of the Weimar Republic
Films directed by Joe May
German black-and-white films
German silent feature films
German war films
World War I prisoner of war films
Films set in the 1910s
Films produced by Erich Pommer
Films with screenplays by Fritz Wendhausen
Films with screenplays by Joe May
1928 war films
UFA GmbH films
Films set in Hamburg
Films shot at Babelsberg Studios
German prison films
Films scored by Karl Hajos
Silent war films
1920s German films
1920s German-language films